Hexagonal and Grid Mapping System is a 1981 role-playing game supplement published by The Companions.

Contents
Hexagonal and Grid Mapping System is a package of 50 one-sided letter-sized hex sheets for game mapping, stored in a wrap-around folder.

Reception
Lewis Pulsipher reviewed Hexagonal and Grid Mapping System in The Space Gamer No. 50. Pulsipher commented that "This is an impressive product.  If you want to hex-map large areas of a role-playing world, I know of no better aid."

References

Fantasy role-playing game supplements
Role-playing game mapping aids
Role-playing game supplements introduced in 1981